William Franklin "Frank" Mitchell is a Republican politician from North Carolina, USA.

A farmer and machine shop owner from Olin, he served six terms in the North Carolina General Assembly, representing North Carolina's ninety-sixth House district, including constituents in Iredell County. He lost the 2004 Republican primary to Julia Craven Howard after a hotly contested race.

Recent electoral history

2004

2002

2000

See also
Politics and government of North Carolina

References

|-

Living people
Year of birth missing (living people)
People from Iredell County, North Carolina
20th-century American politicians
21st-century American politicians
Democratic Party members of the North Carolina House of Representatives